Andinosaura petrorum is a species of lizard in the family Gymnophthalmidae. The species is endemic to Ecuador.

Etymology
The specific name, petrorum (masculine genitive plural), is in honor of three men named Peters or Peter: German zoologist Wilhelm Peters, American herpetologist James A. Peters, and American herpetologist Peter D. Spoecker.

Habitat
The natural habitat of A. petrorum is forest.

Reproduction
A. petrorum is oviparous.

References

Further reading
Doan TM, Castoe TA (2005). "Phylogenetic taxonomy of the Cercosaurini (Squamata: Gymnophthalmidae), with new genera for species of Neusticurus and Proctoporus ". Zoological Journal of the Linnean Society 143: 405–416. (Riama petrorum, new combination).
Kizirian, David A. (1996). "A Review of Ecuadorian Proctoporus (Squamata: Gymnophthalmidae) with Descriptions of Nine New Species". Herpetological Monographs 10: 85–155. (Proctoporus petrorum, new species).
Sánchez-Pacheco SJ, Torres-Carvajal O, Aguirre-Peñafiel V, Sales Nunes PM, Verrastro L, Rivas GA, Rodrigues MT, Grant T, Murphy RW (2017). "Phylogeny of Riama (Squamata: Gymnophthalmidae), impact of phenotypic evidence on molecular datasets, and the origin of the Sierra Nevada de Santa Marta endemic fauna". Cladistics 34 (3): 260–291. (Andinosaura petrorum, new combination).

Andinosaura
Reptiles of Ecuador
Endemic fauna of Ecuador
Reptiles described in 1996
Taxa named by David A. Kizirian
Taxobox binomials not recognized by IUCN